Napi may refer to:

 Näpi, an alevik (borough) in Estonia
 Napi, Hiiu County, a village in Hiiu Parish, Hiiu County, Estonia
 Napi, Võru County, a village in Setomaa Parish, Võru County, Estonia
 Napi Headquarters, New Mexico, a census-designated place (CDP) in San Juan County, New Mexico, United States
 Napi Gazdaság (meaning Daily Business in English), a daily newspaper published in Hungary
 Napioa, an important figure in Blackfoot mythology
 New API, an interface to use interrupt mitigation techniques for networking devices in the Linux kernel